This is a list of all the sedimentary formation that are found in Belgium.